Marc-André Servant (born July 1, 1991 in Montreal, Quebec) is a Canadian former competitive ice dancer. With partner Andréanne Poulin, he is the 2015 Skate Canada Autumn Classic silver medalist and 2012 Canadian national junior champion.

Poulin and Servant were coached for a number of years by Shawn Winter and Elise Hamel at the Deux-Rives Figure Skating Club in Pierrefonds, Quebec. In 2015, they moved to train with Carol Lane, Juris Razgulajevs, and Jon Lane at the Scarboro FSC in Ontario. The duo retired from competition on August 4, 2016.

Programs 
(with Poulin)

Competitive highlights 
CS: Challenger Series; JGP: Junior Grand Prix

With Poulin

References

External links 

 

1991 births
Canadian male ice dancers
French Quebecers
Living people
People from Vaudreuil-Dorion
Figure skaters from Montreal